Pristiphora cincta is a Holarctic species of  sawfly.

References

External links
 The sawflies (Symphyta) of Britain and Ireland

Hymenoptera of Europe
Taxa named by Edward Newman
Tenthredinidae
Insects described in 1837